Gazi Mihal Bridge is a historic Ottoman bridge in Edirne, Turkey. it crosses the Tunca.

The bridge was originally built by the Byzantine emperor Michael VIII (1259-1282) but was rebuilt early in the 15th century by the Ottoman frontier lord Gazi Mihal. In 1544, Ottoman sultan Suleiman the Magnificent  (r. 1520-1566) added eight arches at its western end, which had originally eight arches. Sultan Mehmed III (r. 1595-1603) added a span with two arches, which is called the middle bridge.

References

 Ottoman Architecture, John Freely, page 87, 2011

Ottoman bridges in Turkey
Arch bridges in Turkey
Bridges over the Tunca
Bridges in Edirne
Road bridges in Turkey